Guglielmo Manzi (25 August 1784 - 21 February 1821) was an Italian classicist and librarian of what was then the Biblioteca Barberiniana.

Biography
He was born in Civitavecchia. He studied first at Montefiascone, then with the Oratorians in Rome. First he went to work in Livorno with his mercantile family. But his erudition gained him a position as librarian in the Barberini collection. The library became part of the Vatican Library in 1902. He made a career of republishing out of print works, or their translations. 

In 1814 he translated into Italian the text of Istoria romana di Cajo Vellejo Patercolo. In 1816, Orazioni di Stefano Porcari (Speeches by 15th-century political opponent of civic Papal authority); in 1818, he wrote Discorso sopra gli spettacoli, le feste ed i lusso degli Italiani nel secolo XIV. In 1815, in honor of his patron, he edited Regimento dei costumi delle donne written by Francesco da Barberino. He published in 1819 Dialoghi di Luciano di Samosata under a pseudonymous name of Lo-anna. He published a treatise on painting, putatively written by Leonardo da Vinci, and collected by Francesco Melzi. 

In 1818, he edited Viaggio di Lionardo di Niccolò Frescobaldi, in Egitto e in Terra Santa, con un discorso dell' editore sopra il commercio degl' italiani nel secolo XIV. The manuscript describes the travels of the Florentine merchant, Leonardo Frescobaldi, in 13814-1385 to the Levant. Manzi added a commentary on travels by Tuscan merchants in that era. 

He also edited in 1817 Trattati della compunzione del cuore di San Giovanni Grisostomo. He also edited translation of writing of Cicero. He died in Rome.

References

External links 
 

1784 births
1821 deaths
19th-century Italian writers
Italian librarians